Pterodon ("winged tooth") is an extinct genus of superficially wolf-like hyainailurids from subtribe Pterodontina within polyphyletic  tribe Hyainailourini in paraphyletic subfamily Hyainailourinae, that lived in late Eocene Europe.

Classification and phylogeny

Taxonomy
Pterodon nyanzae is now considered to be synonymous with Hyainailouros. Likewise, the putative Asian species P. dahkoensis is now assigned to its own genus, Orienspterodon.

Phylogeny
The phylogenetic relationships of genus Pterodon are shown in the following cladogram:

See also
 Mammal classification
 Hyainailourini

References

Hyaenodonts
Eocene mammals
Eocene mammals of Europe
Prehistoric placental genera